Oliver James Borg D'Anastasi, known as OJ Borg (born 4 April 1979), is a British radio and television presenter employed by the BBC.

Career

Radio
Borg is currently the presenter of BBC Radio 2's weekday overnight programme. He has previously deputised for Janice Long, Alex Lester, Steve Wright, Scott Mills and Craig Charles. When Steve Wright was replaced by Scott Mills in 2022, Borg covered the Afternoon Show from 2 to 5pm for several weeks between the two presenters on Radio 2.
 
Borg also co-owns his own production company – MegaCityDigital – through which he produces and hosts a cycling podcast and a Mixed martial arts (MMA) podcast for the BBC, directed and presented '100 things to do on your bike' for the Bike Channel and produced social media content for the Esports awards.

Previously, he presented BBC Radio 5 Live's cycling show BeSpoke.

For two years he was the presenter of The Hometime show on Key 103, before that he co-hosted the drivetime programme on Kerrang Radio with Kate Lawler.

In 2007, Borg presented The Saturday Breakfast Show on Xfm South Wales before the station was sold and renamed Nation Radio. In his early career he co-hosted the breakfast show on 96.2 The Revolution.

From 2016 to 2017, he also presented Rock 'N' Roll Football on Absolute Radio.

In August 2018, Borg covered the Radio 2 drivetime Show with Angela Scanlon.

In December 2020, he covered the Saturday breakfast show on Boxing Day from 8am-10am.

Television

In 2005, Borg moved to London to host a daily live show on VH1 – Radio Gaga – with Absolute Radio's Sarah Champion. While working for MTV networks he also presented the Rewind and Ultimate charts, the film show Screen, and fronted guides to the Oxegen Festival in Ireland and the clubs of Ibiza. He also presented TMF Kicks, working first with Carole Machin, then Kate Edmondson.

For three years, Borg was a regular presenter of the National Lottery and EuroMillions programmes on BBC One.

On 12 September 2007, Borg, along with Lynsey Horn, launched the new Freeview channel Nuts TV, presenting the weeknight live shows along with gameshow North vs South. During this time he also presented with Chanelle Hayes and Lucy Pinder.

Borg was a continuity voice on newly branded channel Fiver, and took part in The Bullrun, a Gumball 3000 style rally across the United States which was documented for Channel 4 and Nuts TV.

Borg has a keen interest in MMA and is the post-fight interviewer for BAMMA broadcasting live on Channel 5. He is also the host of the monthly magazine show UFC Fighting Talk on BT Sport.

He has presented darts coverage for ITV4 and recently presented at the Le Mans 24 hour race for Nissan.

On 27 December 2011, he appeared on Celebrity Mastermind on BBC One. Taking Star Wars as his specialist subject (and dressed as Princess Leia), he finished third with 21 points.

Esports
Borg worked with ESL at ESL One Cologne 2015 and ESL One Cologne 2019 as Stage host, as well as multiple other ESL and IEM events – most recently IEM Katowice 2023. He has also worked with ESL for the Call of Duty World League, where he hosted events in the European region.

From October 2020, Borg has presented World of Zwift, a weekly round-up of what's going on in Zwift racing.

References

External links
OJ Borg (BBC Radio 2)
One Hit Wonders with OJ Borg (BBC Radio 2)

1979 births
Living people
British people of Maltese descent
British radio personalities
English radio personalities
People from Leicester
Darts people
BBC Radio 2 presenters